Ranularia testudinaria is a species of predatory sea snail, a marine gastropod mollusk in the family Cymatiidae.

Description
The shell size is between 50 mm and 100 mm.

Distribution
This species occurs in the Indian Ocean off the Mascarene Basin, along the Philippines and in the Western Pacific Ocean off New Caledonia.

References

 Beu, A.G., 1998. Indo-West Pacific Ranellidae, Bursidae and Personidae (Mollusca: Gastropoda). A monograph of the New Caledonian fauna and revision of related taxa. Mémoires du Muséum national d'Histoire naturelle 178: 1-255
 Drivas, J. & M. Jay (1988). Coquillages de La Réunion et de l'île Maurice.

External links
 Adams, A. & Reeve, L. A. (1848–1850). Mollusca. In A. Adams (ed.), The zoology of the voyage of H.M.S. Samarang, under the command of Captain Sir Edward Belcher, C.B., F.R.A.S., F.G.S., during the years 1843-1846. Reeve & Benham, London, x + 87 pp., 24 pls

Cymatiidae
Gastropods described in 1850